is a passenger railway station located in the city of Matsuyama, Ehime Prefecture, Japan. It is operated by JR Shikoku and has the station number "Y48".

Lines
Connections with other local or limited express trains are needed to travel further east or west along the line.

Layout
The station, which is unstaffed, consists of a side platform and an island platform serving two tracks. The track on the side of Platform 1 is the main line track used by through traffic (speed limit 100 km/h), and the track on the side of Platforms 2 and 3 is the secondary main line. In principle, trains in both directions enter Platform 1, unless there is a crossing of an oncoming train, a freight train, or a freight train that departs from or arrives at this station.

Adjacent stations

History
At that time the station was operated by Japanese Government Railways, later becoming Japanese National Railways (JNR). With the privatization of JNR on 1 April 1987, control of the station passed to JR Shikoku.

Surrounding area
Hōjō Port
Matsuyama City Hall Hojo Branch (former Hōjō City Hall)
St. Catherine's College

See also
 List of railway stations in Japan

References

External links
Station timetable

Railway stations in Ehime Prefecture
Railway stations in Japan opened in 1926
Railway stations in Matsuyama, Ehime